was the 13th (and last) daimyō of Komono Domain in Ise Province (modern-day Mie Prefecture) in early Meiji period Japan.

Biography
Hijikata Katsuyuki was the nephew of the 10th daimyō of Komono, Hijikata Katsuoki, and was heir to a 1000 koku hatamoto holding. He was adopted as heir to the 12th daimyō, Hijikata Katsunaga who was only five years his senior, in 1869, as Katsunaga was very sickly. Katsunaga retired the same year, and Katsuyuki was proclaimed daimyō; however, by this time that title had been formally abolished by the new Meiji government and his official title was that of imperial governor. In 1871, after the abolition of the han system he moved to Tokyo, and in November of the same year, he entered Keio University to study the English language

In 1878, he joined the Ministry of Industry. With the establishment of kazoku peerage on July 8, 1884, he was made a viscount (shishaku) and served as a member of the House of Peers from July 1890 to July 1897.  In 1899, he was the secretary of the Camphor Bureau of the Governor-General of Taiwan. On his return to mainland Japan, he again served as a member of the House of Peers from July 1918 to July 1925.

In November 1925, he retired in favor of his nephew, Hijikata Katsutake.  Katsutake's father, Hisaakira Hijikata, was Katsuyuki's younger brother and was subsequently the 12th president of the Bank of Japan. Hijikata Katsuyuki died on April 24, 1931 and his grave is at the temple of Gensho-ji in Komono.

References
 Hijikata family info on "Edo Daimyo Kugyo" site
 Japanese Wiki entry on Katsuyuki

1856 births
1932 deaths
Tozama daimyo
Kazoku
Keio University alumni
Members of the House of Peers (Japan)